Lobophytum mortoni is a coral species of the genus Lobophytum.

References 

Animals described in 2009
Alcyoniidae